Charith Sudaraka (born 14 August 1995) is a Sri Lankan cricketer. He made his first-class debut for Colts Cricket Club in the 2016–17 Premier League Tournament on 6 January 2017.

References

External links
 

1995 births
Living people
Sri Lankan cricketers
Colts Cricket Club cricketers
People from Southern Province, Sri Lanka